Raymond Auguste Quinsac Monvoisin (May 31, 1790 – March 26, 1870) was a French artist and painter.

Biography
Monvoisin was born in Bordeaux. Although he initiated a career in the military by indication of his father, at the age of eighteen Monvoisin fully dedicated himself to painting. He moved from Bordeaux to Paris and was employed at the workshop of Pierre Guérin, with whom he worked in the neoclassic and mythologic themes that were center of attention by artists and scholars at the time. He studied in the Académie des Beaux-Arts of France, and his work soon earned him the support of the critics. His works achieved commercial success. He was hired by merchants, bankers and other members of the newly emerging middle-class. In 1819 he carried out his first exposition in the Museum of the Louvre. The fame he achieved in his own country earned him the Legion of Honor. After obtaining recognition in Paris, he travelled to Italy where he obtained a scholarship to study in Villa Medici in Rome.

Interested in the opportunities in the newly independent Americas, Monvoisin travelled to Argentina and from there to Chile. He received an official invitation from the Chilean government to direct the Academy of Painting which was officially created on March 17, 1848. With almost no funds, he arrived at Santiago. Preceded by his fame, he was introduced to the high-class families of the capital and, in turn, to work as a successful portrait painter. His works had a decisive influence in the new Chilean society, which acquired the inclinations of European fashion, especially French.

He dedicated his efforts to many different activities during his stay in Chile. He traveled through the country, invested in mines, and created a ranching estate. His first years as a drawing professor in Paris helped in forming notable artists of the time like Francisco Mandiola and Procesa Sarmiento. Along with French painter Clara Filleul, he mobilized the pictorial art in Chile and Argentina.  He was elevated to a Knight of the Legion of Honor in 1857, and returned to France in 1858, but his fame had vanished.

He died in poverty in 1870 at Boulogne-sur-Mer.

References 

 This article is based on a translation from the corresponding article from the Spanish Wikipedia, dated July 13, 2006.
  Instituto Cultural de las Condes. Precursores extranjeros en la pintura chilena, Santiago de Chile, 1974.
  Brief biography
  Arts Portal of Chile

External links

1790 births
1870 deaths
Artists from Bordeaux
19th-century French painters
French male painters
Chevaliers of the Légion d'honneur
French neoclassical painters
French expatriates in Chile
19th-century French male artists